The Philippine House Special Committee on the North Luzon Growth Quadrangle is a special committee of the Philippine House of Representatives.

Jurisdiction 
As prescribed by House Rules, the committee's jurisdiction is on the policies and programs concerning the development of municipalities, cities, provinces and other local communities in the northwest Luzon area; and other actions to promote growth and expand avenues of economic cooperation with contiguous areas.

Members, 18th Congress

See also 
 House of Representatives of the Philippines
 List of Philippine House of Representatives committees

References

External links 
House of Representatives of the Philippines

North Luzon Growth Quadrangle
Luzon